Ramzi S. Cotran (1932-2000) was a pathologist and former president of the United States and Canadian Academy of Pathology (USCAP).  He was chair of pathology at Harvard's Brigham and Women's Hospital and Children's Hospital Medical Center, as well as the Frank B. Mallory Professor of Pathology at Harvard Medical School and a member of the National Academy of Science's Institute of Medicine.  The Ramzi Cotran Young Investigator Award is presented each year by USCAP to a pathologist in recognition of a body of investigative work which has contributed significantly to the diagnosis and understanding of human disease.

Cotran was born in Haifa (then in Palestine) and studied at the American University of Beirut before moving to the U.S.

References

External links
 ASIP biography

1932 births
2000 deaths
American pathologists
Mandatory Palestine emigrants to the United States
People from Haifa
American University of Beirut alumni
Palestinian pathologists
Members of the National Academy of Medicine